Barry Bingham may refer to:
Barry Bingham Sr. (1906–1988), American media executive
Barry Bingham Jr. (1933–2006), American media executive, son of the above
Edward Bingham (1881–1939), Royal Navy admiral and Victoria Cross recipient